Hitler Brothers is a 1997 Indian Malayalam-language action film directed by Sandhya Mohan and produced by E. Unni Krishnan. The film stars Prem Kumar, Jagathy Sreekumar, Mala Aravindan and A. C. Zainuddin in the lead roles. The film has musical score by S. P. Venkatesh. Babu Antony made a cameo appearance.

Plot
Nandini has four uncles who care for her like a daughter. As she starts studying in college, she falls in love with a police officer. However, her uncles make it difficult for them to be together.

Cast
Prem Kumar as SI Sundaran
Jagathy Sreekumar as Adv. Manmadhan
Mala Aravindan as Ramankutty, one of the "Hitler Brothers"
A. C. Zainuddin as Keshavan Kutty, one of the "Hitler Brothers"
Paravoor Bharathan as Achuthan Kutty, one of the "Hitler Brothers"
Jose Pellissery as Shankaran Kutty, one of the "Hitler Brothers"
Babu Antony as Narendran
Vanitha Vijayakumar as Nandini, niece of "Hitler Brothers"
Harishree Ashokan as Police Head Constable Bhaktha Valsalan
Indrans as Police Constable Balaraman 
Janardhanan as CI Trivikraman Pilla
Vijayakumar as Dr. Gopan
 Augustine as Govindan, a marriage broker
Kuthiravattam Pappu as Nanappan, father of SI Sundaran and Sundari
 Baiju Johnson as Chinnathamby, a notorious goon
Rajkumar as Periya Thamby
Bindu Varappuzha
Salu Koottanad
Shaju
Sharmily as Sundari, sister to SI Sundaran
Kalabhavan Navas as Thankappan, a bus conductor
Ravi Vallathol as H. C. Kuttan Pilla

Soundtrack
The music was composed by S. P. Venkatesh and the lyrics were written by Kaithapram.

References

External links
 

1997 films
1990s Malayalam-language films
Films scored by S. P. Venkatesh
Indian comedy films